Marcel-André Casasola Merkle (born 10 August 1977 in Nuremberg, Bavaria, Germany) is a game designer.

Until now, he published thirteen games and illustrated over 20. Together with other designers, he is active as a game editor since 1999 (amongst others for TransAmerica, 2002). He is co-founder (2000) of the publishing company Lookout Games. His games "Verräter" ("traitor") and "Meuterer" ("mutineer") have won the "À-la-carte-Kartenspielpreis" price of the German games magazine "Fairplay". He's also the initiator of the wiki "Lexikon des Spieleerfindens" ("lexicon of game-invention").

External links

 
 

1977 births
Living people
German game designers
People from Nuremberg